Glucose phosphate broth is used to perform Methyl Red (MR) test and Voges Proskauer (VP) test.

Contents 
Glucose - 5 g/L
Dipotassium phosphate - 5 g/L
Proteose Peptone - 5 g/L
Distilled water - 1000 mL
pH – 6.9

Methyl Red test 
Principle:
It is used to determine the ability of an organism to produce mixed acids by fermentation of glucose and to overcome the buffering capacity of the medium.

Procedure 
Inoculate MacConkey's (Glucose phosphate broth) with pure culture of test organism. Incubate the broth at 35 °C for 48–72 hours.
After incubation add 5 drops of Methyl Red directly into the broth, through the sides of the tube.

Interpretation 
The development of stable red color in the surface of the medium indicates sufficient acid production to lower the pH to 4.4 and constitute a positive test. Since other organism may produce lesser quantities of acid from the test substrate, an intermediate orange color between yellow and red may develop. This does not indicate positive test.

Controls 
Positive and negative controls should be run after preparation of each lot of medium.
Positive control: Escherichia coli
Negative control: Klebsiella

Voges Proskauer test

Principle 
It is used to determine the ability of some organisms to produce a neutral end product, acetyl methyl carbinol (acetoin) from glucose fermentation. The production of acetoin, a neutral reacting end product produced by members such as Klebsiella, Enterobacter etc., is the chief end product of glucose metabolism and form less quantities of mixed acids. In the presence of atmospheric oxygen and 40% KOH, acetoin is converted to diacetyl and α-Naphthol serves as catalyst to bring out red color complex.

Media
Glucose Phosphate Broth

Reagents 
A: α-Naphthol – 5 g
Absolute Ethyl Alcohol – 100 mL – 0.6 mL – 3 parts
B: KOH – 40 g 
Distilled water – 100 mL - 0.2 mL – 1 part

Procedure  
Inoculate a tube of glucose phosphate broth with a pure inoculum of test organism and incubate at 35 °C for 24 hours.
To 1 mL of this broth add 0.6 mL of 5% α-Naphthol followed by 0.2 mL of 40% KOH. Shake the tube gently to expose the medium to atmospheric oxygen and allow the tube to remain undisturbed for 10–15 minutes.

Interpretation 
A positive test is represented by the development of red color in 15 minutes or more after addition of the reagents, indicating the presence of diacetyl, the oxidation product of acetoin. The test should be red, after standing for 1 hour because negative VP cultures may produce copper-like colour potentially resulting in a false positive interpretation, also because due to action of the reagents when mixed.

Controls 
Positive and negative controls should be run after preparation of each lot of medium.
Positive control: Klebsiella
Negative control: Escherichia coli

References 

PH indicators
Microbiology techniques